Sabine Jahn (later Gust, born 27 June 1953) is a German rower who competed for East Germany in the 1976 Summer Olympics.

She was born in Neuruppin. She is married to Reinhard Gust and has competed since the 1977 rowing season under her married name.

In 1976 she and her partner Petra Boesler won an Olympic silver medal in the double sculls event. In February 1978, she was given the sports awards Honoured Master of Sports.

References

External links 
 

1953 births
Living people
Sportspeople from Neuruppin
East German female rowers
Olympic rowers of East Germany
Rowers at the 1976 Summer Olympics
Olympic silver medalists for East Germany
Olympic medalists in rowing
World Rowing Championships medalists for East Germany
Medalists at the 1976 Summer Olympics
Recipients of the Patriotic Order of Merit in bronze
Recipients of the Honoured Master of Sport
European Rowing Championships medalists